Blue Mills is an unincorporated community in Jackson County, in the U.S. state of Missouri.

History
The community was named for a watermill on the Blue River. A post office called Blue Mill was established in 1835, and remained in operation until 1895. A variant name was Twyman.

References

Unincorporated communities in Jackson County, Missouri
Unincorporated communities in Missouri